Piotr Kwasigroch (born 1 June 1962) is a Polish former ice hockey player and coach. He played for Naprzód Janów, Kölner EC, EV Füssen, the Kassel Huskies, GEC Nordhorn, EV Landsberg, and Neusser EV during his career. After nine years in the Polish league, Kwasigroch was allowed to move to West Germany, spending the rest of his career with German teams, and turning to coaching near the end. He also played for the Polish national team at the 1988 Winter Olympics and the 1986 and 1989 World Championships.

Playing career 
Kwasigroch scored 572 points during his playing career in Germany. He is currently the 5th highest-scoring Polish forward in Deutsche Eishockey Liga (DEL) history, with 65 points scored across his 138 games for the Kassel Huskies. He was part of the Kölner EC team that finished runners up in the 1991 and 1993 DEL seasons, scoring 152 points across 180 games for the club.

He played 39 games for Poland at international competitions including as part of the Polish team that recorded a historic victory in 1986 against the then-defending World Champions Czechoslovakia.

References

External links
 

1962 births
Living people
EV Füssen players
EV Landsberg players
Ice hockey players at the 1988 Winter Olympics
Kassel Huskies players
Kölner Haie players
Naprzód Janów players
Olympic ice hockey players of Poland
Polish emigrants to Germany
Polish ice hockey coaches
Polish ice hockey forwards
Sportspeople from Katowice